Concord is a census-designated place (CDP) in St. Louis County, Missouri, United States. The population was 16,421 at the 2010 census. It should not be confused with Concord Township; which the CDP shares much land with, but these areas' boundaries are not identical.

Geography
Concord is located at  (38.514386, -90.353666). The CDP is shaped roughly like a figure 8, with the southern loop larger and more rounded than the angular northern loop.

Concord is mostly bounded by highways—by Interstate 255, U.S. Route 67 (locally called Lindbergh Boulevard and co-signed here with U.S. Route 50 and U.S. Route 61), Route 21 (known locally as Tesson Ferry Road), and Route 30 (known locally as Gravois Road). Interstate 270 bisects the CDP's southern node.

Adjacent areas
 Sappington CDP (west)
 Grantwood Village (north)
 Affton CDP (northeast)
 Lakeshire (northeast)
 Green Park (east)
 Mehlville CDP (east)

Demographics

As of the census of 2000, there were 16,689 people, 6,926 households, and 5,000 families living in the CDP. The racial makeup of the CDP was 97.95% White, 0.31% African American, 0.09% Native American, 0.83% Asian, 0.01% Pacific Islander, 0.25% from other races, and 0.57% from two or more races. Hispanic or Latino of any race were 0.84% of the population.

There were 6,926 households, out of which 25.7% had children under the age of 18 living with them, 61.6% were married couples living together, 8.2% had a female householder with no husband present, and 27.8% were non-families. 24.5% of all households were made up of individuals, and 12.1% had someone living alone who was 65 years of age or older. The average household size was 2.41 and the average family size was 2.88.

In the CDP, the population was spread out, with 20.6% under the age of 18, 6.5% from 18 to 24, 23.8% from 25 to 44, 27.9% from 45 to 64, and 21.3% who were 65 years of age or older. The median age was 44 years. For every 100 females, there were 91.5 males. For every 100 females age 18 and over, there were 88.2 males.

The median income for a household in the CDP was $55,275, and the median income for a family was $64,155. Males had a median income of $47,975 versus $31,675 for females. The per capita income for the CDP was $26,933. About 1.1% of families and 1.7% of the population were below the poverty line, including 1.8% of those under age 18 and 1.7% of those age 65 or over.

ZIP codes 
Most of Concord lies in the 63128 ZIP code; however, a significant northern portion is assigned to the 63123 ZIP code.

School districts 
Concord contains land in the Lindbergh School District in the north and the Mehlville School District in the south, although only a few schools, Mehlville's Washington Middle School and Trautwein Elementary School, are located inside Concord itself (Lindbergh's Concord Elementary is in Sappington.)

All residents of the Lindbergh district are zoned to Lindbergh High School. Residents of the Mehlville district are zoned to Mehlville High School

References

Census-designated places in St. Louis County, Missouri
Census-designated places in Missouri